Lippo Limited is a Hong Kong incorporated listed company. It is the parent company of Hongkong Chinese Limited,  and Auric Pacific Group, all listed companies. Founded by Indonesian Chinese Mochtar Riady, Lippo Limited was majority owned by Lippo Capital; in turn Lippo Capital was 60% owned by Mochtar's son Stephen Riady (via Lippo Capital Group), as well as his brother James Tjahaja Riady (via PT Trijaya Utama Mandiri).

History 
Public Finance (H.K.) Limited was incorporated on 30 January 1973. On 30 July 1991 the company was renamed to Lippo Limited.

In 1998 via subsidiary Lippo China Resources, the group formed a joint venture Lippo CRE (Financial Services) Limited with China Resources Enterprise to act as the parent company of The HKCB Bank Holding Limited (now known as Hongkong Chinese Limited), which in turn the parent company of Hongkong Chinese Bank for 60.6% shares. The price was about HK$1.2 billion.

In 2001, Lippo China Resources re-acquired 50% shares of Lippo CRE (Financial Services) Limited (which owned 58.78% shares of HKCB Bank Holding), as well as an additional 5.84% shares of HKCB Bank Holding from China Resources Enterprise for about HK$1.8 billion, effectively buying 35.23% interests in HKCB Bank Holding. In the same year HKCB Bank Holding sold the entire share capital of Hongkong Chinese Bank to CITIC Ka Wah Bank for HK$4.2 billion.

In December 2016, second-tier subsidiary Auric Pacific Group (a listed company majority owned by Lippo China Resources) was privatized by Lippo Limited's chairman Stephen Riady (son of Mochtar Riady) and his son-in-law Andy Adhiwana (via a SPV Silver Creek Capital) for S$1.65 per shares.

Subsidiaries 
 Lippo China Resources (71.2%)
 Hongkong Chinese (65.8%)
former
 Auric Pacific Group
 Délifrance Asia Ltd. (100%)
 Delifrance Singapore Pte. Ltd. (100%)
 Delifrance (HK) Ltd. (100%)
 Delifrance (Malaysia) Sdn. Bhd. (100%)
 Shanghai Delifrance Foodstuff Co., Ltd. (100%)

Footnotes

References

External links 
 

Companies listed on the Hong Kong Stock Exchange
Conglomerate companies of Hong Kong